The first cabinet of Ion Antonescu was the government of Romania from 4 September to 14 September 1940.

Ministers
The ministers of the cabinet were as follows:

References

Cabinets of Romania
Cabinets established in 1940
Cabinets disestablished in 1940
1940 establishments in Romania
1940 disestablishments in Romania